Danmarks Næste Topmodel, cycle 6 was the sixth cycle of Danmarks Næste Topmodel. After hosting five consecutive cycles, Caroline Fleming left her role for the season. She was replaced by Cecilie Lassen. This season the cast consisted of 13 contestants. It was the only cycle to feature male contestants. There was no international destination this cycle.

The winner was 16-year-old Daniel Kildevæld Madsen from Horsens.

Prizes

 A contract with Unique Models.
 A cover and spread for COVER magazine
 A 2-year long contract for Beauté Pacifique

Contestants
(ages stated are at start of contest)

Episode summaries

Episode 1
Original Airdate: 

First eliminated: Ejner Bjerrum & Anna Liebman
Second eliminated: Malou Kirstine Jeppson, Kasper Stig Henriksen & Amalie Borre

Episode 2
Original Airdate: 

Photo of the week: Daniel Kildevæld Madsen
Bottom two: Issa Sultan & Kamilla Spinola Sørensen
Eliminated: Kamilla Spinola Sørensen

Episode 3
Original Airdate: 

Challenge winners: Malle Turpie & Simone Holme Pallesen
Photo of the week: Malle Turpie
First eliminated: Gustav Pedersen
Bottom two: Kenni Nielsen & Lukas Anker
Eliminated: None

Episode 4
Original Airdate: 

Photo of the week: Thomas Kahle
First eliminated: Julia Just Holch
Bottom two: Issa Sultan & Lukas Anker
Eliminated: Issa Sultan

Episode 5
Original Airdate: 

Photo of the week: Thea Brandi
Bottom two: Helene Skovsgaard Hansen & Simone Holme Pallesen
Eliminated: Simone Holme Pallesen

Episode 6
Original Airdate: 

Challenge winners: Helene Skovsgaard Hansen, Kenni Nielsen & Malle Turpie
Photo of the week: Lukas Anker
Bottom two:  Kenni Nielsen & Lukas Anker
Eliminated: Lukas Anker

Episode 7
Original Airdate: 

Challenge winner: Daniel Kildevæld Madsen
Performance of the week: Mark Christiansen Appadoo
Bottom two:  Helene Skovsgaard Hansen & Kenni Nielsen
Eliminated: Kenni Nielsen

Episode 8
Original Airdate: 

Booked for campaign: Daniel Kildevæld Madsen & Helene Skovsgaard Hansen
Photo of the week: Malle Turpie
Bottom two: Helene Skovsgaard Hansen & Mark Christiansen Appadoo
Eliminated: Helene Skovsgaard Hansen

Episode 9
Original Airdate: 

This week the models had their go sees and at the photoshoot they had to impersonate a celebrity.

Challenge winner: Malle Turpie
Photo of the week: Mark Christiansen Appadoo
First Eliminated: Thomas Kahle
Bottom two: Mark Christiansen Appadoo & Thea Brandi
Eliminated: Thea Brandi
Guest judge: Oliver Bjerrehuus

Episode 10
Original Airdate: 

Eliminated: Mark Christiansen Appadoo 
Final two: Daniel Kildevæld Madsen & Malle Turpie
Denmark's Next Top Model: Daniel Kildevæld Madsen

Summaries

Results table

 The contestant won photo of the week
 The contestant won photo of the week but was eliminated
 The contestant was in danger of elimination
 The contestant was eliminated
 The contestant won the competition

Photo shoot guide
Episode 1 photo shoot: Natural Beauty
Episode 2 photo shoot: Fight Club sports editorial
Episode 3 photo shoot: Saturday Night Fever
Episode 4 photo shoot: Couples on the beach in B&W
Episode 5 photo shoot: Fashion riot in the street
Episode 6 photo shoot: Sailors on a yacht
Episode 7 music video: "Say my name" - Kesi
Episode 8 photo shoot: Poetic dog walkers
Episode 9 photo shoot: Celebrity look-alikes
Episode 10 photo shoot:  Covers for COVER magazine

Post–Topmodel careers

Kamilla Sofie Spinola Sørensen has taken a couple of test shots and modeled for Maria Black Jewelry. She retired from modeling in 2017.
Gustav Pedersen has coming out as transgender under the name Celine Marguerite. She did not pursue modeling after the show  but was appeared on an editorials for i-D Germany.
Julia Just Holch signed with Étoile Models, WOW Casting agency and Ps Model Management in Munich. She has taken a couple of test shots and walked in the fashion shows for Bitte Kai Rand A/W 2018 during Copenhagen Fashion Week 2018. She has modeled for ONLY Official, Maria Black Jewelry, Nikolaj Storm Copenhagen, Dedicated. brand, Basic Apparel,... Beside modelling, Holch is also appeared in several music videos such as "Når Du Ser Mig Nu" by Benjamin Rihan, "Attraction" by Alexander Grandjean ft. ALEA,... and own a jewellery lined called Julia Just.
Lukas Anker signed with Unique Models and taken a couple of test shots, befor retire from modeling in 2016.
Helene Skovsgaard Hansen has taken a couple of test shots and compete on several beauty-pageant competitions like Miss World Denmark 2016, Supermodel International 2017 World Final, Miss Tourism Queen International 2018, Face of Beauty International 2018, Miss Planet International 2022, Miss Queen of Scandinavia Denmark,...
Thea Brandi signed with Unique Models. She has taken a couple of test shots and appeared on a spread for Elle Denmark. She has walked in the fashion shows during Copenhagen Fashion Week such as Henrik Vibskov, Designers' Nest,... She retired from modeling in 2020.
Mark Christiansen Appadoo signed with Unique Models. He has taken a couple of test shots and appeared on the cover and editorials for Le Défi Media Group and walked in the fashion show of such as DK Company A/S during Copenhagen Fashion Week 2016. He is also been modeled for Nixonbui, Jack & Jones, Hairlust,... Appadoo retired from modeling in 2021.
Malle Turpie signed with WOW Casting agency. She has taken a couple of test shots and modeled for Project AJ117 2017 collection. She retired from modeling in 2018.
Daniel Kildevæld Madsen has collected his prizes and signed with Unique Models. He is also signed with Born Models, WOW Casting agency, Stone Model Management, Mad Models Management in Madrid, Anthm Agency in New York City and I AM Model Management in Bali. He has taken a couple of test shots and appeared on an editorials for Cover magazine, Dansk magazine, Influencers magazine, Creators magazine,...  He is also been shooting print works for Beauté Pacifique, Journal 01:6, Rains clothing A/W 2016, Björn Borg, Adeney & Boutroy, BA Final Collection, El Corte Inglés, Florance Van Rinkhuyzen, ECO SEVEN Jeans,... Kildevæld has walked in the fashion shows during Copenhagen Fashion Week 2016 such as Tonsure, Designers' Nest, Uniforms for the Dedicated,...

References

Danmarks Næste Topmodel
2015 Danish television seasons